Khuroson District (1991-2004: Ghozimalik District, before 1991: Kuybyshev District) is a district in Khatlon Region of Tajikistan. It extends south from national capital Dushanbe toward the regional capital Bokhtar. Its capital is the town Obikiik (former name: Pravda). The population of the district is 116,500 (January 2020 estimate).

Administrative divisions
They are as follows:

References

Districts of Khatlon Region
Districts of Tajikistan